Eleonora Bruzual (February 21) is a Venezuelan writer and journalist. She authored with her husband, José Luis Uzcátegui, a Venezuelan psychiatrist and anthropologist, Militaries: heroes or cowards and The Men Who Eroticized Fidel. As a journalist, she contributes to El Nacional, Diario Las Americas and El Nuevo Herald, has a daily radio segment called "Trinchera" on Radio Mambí of Miami (Florida) and is the editor of an information portal called Gentiuno.

References

External links
 Biography of Eleonora Bruzual (in Spanish)
 Presentation of Gentiuno (in Spanish)

Year of birth missing (living people)
Living people
Venezuelan biographers
Venezuelan women journalists
Venezuelan women writers